The 2020 EFL Trophy Final (known for sponsorship reasons as the 2020 Papa John's Trophy Final) was a football match played at Wembley Stadium on 13 March 2021. It decided the winners of the 2019–20 EFL Trophy, the 36th edition of the competition, a knock-out tournament for the 48 teams in League One and League Two and 16 category one academy sides. 

The final was contested by Portsmouth from League One, the defending champions and thus making their second successive final appearance, and Salford City from League Two, who made their finals debut.

Portsmouth and Salford City had never played against each other before this EFL Trophy Final meeting.

The final, which was originally scheduled for 5 April 2020, was postponed because of the effects of the COVID-19 pandemic in the United Kingdom and eventually rescheduled for 13 March 2021.

Route to the final

Portsmouth

Salford City

Match

References

2020
Events at Wembley Stadium
Trophy Final
2020 Trophy Final
EFL Trophy Final
EFL Trophy Final 2020
EFL Trophy Final 2020
EFL Trophy Final 2020
EFL Trophy Final
Football Trophy Final 2020